Caged is a 2020 American drama film directed by Aaron Fjellman and starring Edi Gathegi, Melora Hardin, Angela Sarafyan and Tony Amendola. Fjellman co-wrote the screenplay with James 'Doc' Mason. The film was produced by Pete Kirtley, Aaron Fjellman, Matthew Temple and Jessa Zarubica.

Plot
An affluent African American psychiatrist is sent to federal prison after being found guilty of murdering his wife, and is then transferred to solitary confinement in the Security Housing Unit – (the SHU).

Despite maintaining his innocence, he finds himself a victim of prisoner abuse and, isolated and fighting for an appeal, slowly descends towards madness, pushed to breaking point by an abusive female guard hell bent on dispensing her own form of justice.

Increasingly haunted by internal demons and hallucinations involving his dead wife, he begins to question his own innocence and sanity, making his time in the SHU a never-ending nightmare.

Cast

Filming and production
Filming, under its working title of The SHU, commenced in October 2016. Principal photography  took place at Remmet Studios, in Canoga Park, Los Angeles with exterior filming at Long Beach Shoreline Marina, Palmdale and Anaheim, California. Post-production video and audio editing was carried out in Los Angeles and at Pinewood Studios in Iver.

Release and critical reception
The film had its world premiere at the Pasadena International Film Festival in 2020 and was nominated for Best Feature Film, with Aaron Fjellman winning the Best Director award. Due to the COVID-19 pandemic the film was not released until 2021 in the United States, Canada, the United Kingdom and other territories.

References

External links
 
 
 

2020 films
American drama films
Films shot in Los Angeles
2020s English-language films
2020s American films